Argo-Saronic Gulf is a term sometimes used to combine the adjacent Saronic Gulf and Argolic Gulf of Greece. It contains the Argo-Saronic Islands.

Gulfs of Greece
Gulfs of the Aegean Sea
Saronic Gulf